John Henry Manners, 5th Duke of Rutland KG (4 January 177820 January 1857), styled Lord Roos from 1778 until 1779 and Marquess of Granby from 1779 until 1787, was a British landowner as well as an owner and breeder of Thoroughbred racehorses.

Background
Styled Lord Roos from birth, he was born at Knightsbridge, London, the eldest son of Charles Manners, 4th Duke of Rutland, by Lady Mary Isabella Somerset, daughter of Charles Somerset, 4th Duke of Beaufort. He was the grandson of John Manners, Marquess of Granby, and the brother of Lord Charles Manners and Lord Robert Manners. He became known as the Marquess of Granby when his father succeeded to the dukedom in 1779. In 1787 he himself succeeded to the dukedom on the death of his father.

Public life
Rutland was Lord Lieutenant of Leicestershire between 1799 and 1857. He was also a prominent owner and breeder of Thoroughbred racehorses. His most successful horse was Cadland, which won The Derby in 1828.

Rutland was fictionalized as "the duke" in Benjamin Disraeli's novel Coningsby. His two sons also figured as "the marquis of Beaumanoir" and "Lord Henry Sidney".

There is a bronze statue of him in Market Place, Leicester which was erected on this site in 1852 after having been previously exhibited at the Great Exhibition at Crystal Palace, London in 1851. It was the first public statue to be erected in Leicester, and was unveiled by Sir Frederick Gustavus Fowke, Provincial Grand Master of Freemasons for the Province of Leicestershire, on 28 April 1852. It was sculpted by Edward Davis. It is marked " EDW DAVIS
Simonet & Fils / Fondeurs Paris 1851".
It stands on a high stone plinth on which is carved an inscription as follows:
JOHN HENRY
DUKE OF RUTLAND, KG
LORD LIEUTENANT
OF LEICESTERSHIRE.
THE INHABITANTS
OF THE COUNTY & TOWN
OF LEICESTER
DURING
THE FIFTIETH ANNIVERSARY
OF HIS HIGH OFFICE
WITH UNIVERSAL CONSENT
CAUSED THIS STATUE
TO BE ERECTED
M.DCCC.Lii.

PRAESENTI TIBI MATUROS LARCIMUR HONORES.

Family
Rutland married Lady Elizabeth Howard, daughter of Frederick Howard, 5th Earl of Carlisle, on 22 April 1799.

They had ten children:
Lady Caroline Isabella Manners (25 May 1800–December 1804)
Lady Elizabeth Frederica Manners (10 December 1801 – 20 March 1886), married Andrew Robert Drummond on 7 March 1821. They had seven children. 
Lady Emmeline Charlotte Elizabeth Manners (2 May 1806 – 29 October 1855), married Charles Stuart-Wortley-Mackenzie on 17 February 1831. They had three children. 
George John Henry Manners, Marquess of Granby (26 June 1807 – 4 August 1807)
Lady Katherine Isabella Manners (4 February 1809 – 20 April 1848), married Frederick Hervey, 2nd Marquess of Bristol on 1 December 1830. They had seven children. 
Lady Adeliza Elizabeth Gertrude Manners (29 December 1810 – 26 October 1877), married Reverend F. J. Norman on 22 February 1848. They had one daughter. 
George John Frederick Manners, Marquess of Granby (20 August 1813 – 15 June 1814)
Charles Cecil John Manners, 6th Duke of Rutland (16 May 1815 – 3 March 1888) 
John James Robert Manners, 7th Duke of Rutland (3 December 1818 – 4 August 1906), married Catherine Marley on 10 June 1851. They had one son. He remarried Janetta Hughan on 15 May 1862. They had four children. 
Lord George John Manners (22 June 1820 – 8 September 1874), married Adeliza Fitzalan-Howard (daughter of Henry Fitzalan-Howard, 13th Duke of Norfolk) on 4 Oct 1855. They had five children.

The Duchess oversaw landscaping works at Belvoir Castle grounds and took an active interest in managing the estate, including designing a model farm. She also made improvements to Cheveley Park and oversaw the building works at York House on the Mall for the Duke of York. She was also credited with designing a new palace for George IV.

The Duchess of Rutland died in November 1825, aged 45. Rutland remained a widower until his death at Belvoir Castle, Leicestershire, in January 1857, aged 79.

References

1778 births
1857 deaths
105
Knights of the Garter
Lord-Lieutenants of Leicestershire
J
British landowners
Owners of Epsom Derby winners
J